James Thomas "Jim" Rabbitt (born May 22, 1941) is a businessman and former politician in British Columbia. He represented Yale-Lillooet in the Legislative Assembly of British Columbia from 1986 to 1991 as a Social Credit member.

He was born in Princeton, British Columbia, the son of Patrick J. Rabbitt, and was educated at the University of British Columbia. In 1961, Rabbitt married Eileen A. Goldie. He was an alderman for Merritt and was mayor from 1980 to 1984. Rabbitt served in the provincial cabinet as Minister of Labour and Consumer Services. He was defeated when he ran for reelection in 1991 as a Social Credit member and again in 1996 as a Liberal, losing to Harry Lali each time.

In 1988, he chaired a special legislative committee charged with reviewing the distribution of electoral districts in British Columbia. In 1989, he published Taking action: a strategy for the management of solid wastes as chair of the Municipal Solid Waste Management Task Force.

Electoral history

References 

1941 births
British Columbia municipal councillors
British Columbia Liberal Party candidates in British Columbia provincial elections
British Columbia Social Credit Party MLAs
Living people
Mayors of places in British Columbia
Members of the Executive Council of British Columbia
People from the Thompson-Nicola Regional District
20th-century Canadian politicians
People from Princeton, British Columbia